"Say Anything" is a single released by X Japan on December 1, 1991.

Summary
It is the band's last single released under the name X and the last to feature Taiji on bass. The B-side is a live version of "Silent Jealousy", recorded on November 12, 1991 at Yokohama Arena. Both songs were originally featured on the album Jealousy.

A cover of the title song appears on the album Global Trance 2, by the pop band Globe, of which Yoshiki was briefly a member. It was also used as the theme song for the TV drama .

Commercial performance
The song reached number 3 on the Oricon charts, and charted for 25 weeks. In 1992, with 537,790 copies sold was the 33rd best-selling single of the year, being certified Platinum by RIAJ.

Track listing

Personnel
X
Toshi – vocals
Pata – guitar
hide – guitar
Taiji – bass
Yoshiki – drums, piano

Other
 Co-Producer – Naoshi Tsuda
 Mixed by – Rich Breen
 Art Direction and Design – Mitsuo Izumisawa
 Cover Photography – Hitoshi Iwakiri
 Artist Photography – Hideo Canno

References

X Japan songs
Songs written by Yoshiki (musician)
Japanese television drama theme songs
Heavy metal ballads
1991 singles
Japanese-language songs
1991 songs
Sony Music Entertainment Japan singles
Torch songs
1990s ballads